Aristotelia pamphaea is a moth of the family Gelechiidae. It was described by Edward Meyrick in 1904. It is found in Australia, where it has been recorded from New South Wales.

The forewings are bronzy fuscous, irrorated (sprinkled) with dark fuscous. The hindwings are rather dark fuscous.

References

Moths described in 1904
Aristotelia (moth)
Moths of Australia